The Town of Tennant Creek was a Local Government Area of the Northern Territory. The town council covered an area of 42.2 km² and had a population of about 4,873.

The Tennant Creek Town Council consisted of the Mayor and three aldermen. It was not divided into wards.

History
The Town of Tennant Creek was established in 1978, and its first elected council commenced in May 1978.

On 1 July 2008, the Town ceased to exist, and its area was merged into the Barkly Shire (now Region).

See also
 Barkly Region

References

External links
 Tennant Creek Town Council

Former local government areas of the Northern Territory
2008 disestablishments in Australia
Populated places disestablished in 2008
Tennant Creek